Joaquin Phoenix is an American actor who has received various awards and nominations, including one Academy Award, one British Academy Film Award, two Golden Globe Awards, and one Grammy Award. Additionally, he has been nominated for three Academy Awards, three British Academy Film Awards, and four Golden Globe Awards.

As a child he was briefly credited as Leaf Phoenix, appearing in various films including the 1984 ABC Afterschool Special Backwards: The Riddle of Dyslexia and the 1989 comedy Parenthood. For Backwards: The Riddle of Dyslexia he was nominated for the Young Artist Award for Best Young Actor in a Family Film Made for Television, with his brother River Phoenix. His performance in Parenthood led him to be nominated for the Young Artist Award for Best Leading Young Actor in a Feature Film. Phoenix's breakthrough role in Ridley Scott's critically acclaimed epic historical action-drama Gladiator (2000) earned him the Critics' Choice Movie Award for Best Supporting Actor and the National Board of Review Award for Best Supporting Actor, and he was nominated for the Academy Award for Best Supporting Actor, the Golden Globe Award for Best Supporting Actor – Motion Picture, and the BAFTA Award for Best Actor in a Supporting Role. In 2005, Phoenix appeared in the biographical drama Walk the Line, in which he played the American singer Johnny Cash. For his performance, he won the Golden Globe Award for Best Actor – Motion Picture Musical or Comedy, the Hollywood Film Award for Best Actor, and the Grammy Award for Best Compilation Soundtrack for Visual Media, and he was nominated for the Academy Award for Best Actor, the BAFTA Award for Best Actor in a Leading Role, and the Screen Actors Guild Award for Outstanding Performance by a Male Actor in a Leading Role.

In 2012, Phoenix starred in the psychological drama The Master, in which he portrays a World War II Navy veteran struggling to adjust to a post-war society. He won the Volpi Cup for Best Actor and the Los Angeles Film Critics Association Award for Best Actor, and he was nominated for the Academy Award for Best Actor, the BAFTA Award for Best Actor in a Leading Role, and the Golden Globe Award for Best Actor – Motion Picture Drama. In 2013, Phoenix starred in romantic science-fiction drama Her and received widespread critical acclaim for his performance. He was nominated for the Golden Globe Award for Best Actor – Motion Picture Musical or Comedy, the Saturn Award for Best Actor, and the Washington D.C. Area Film Critics Association Award for Best Actor. In 2017, he appeared in the psychological thriller You Were Never Really Here which received critical acclaim. For this film, Phoenix won the Cannes Film Festival Award for Best Actor and the Florida Film Critics Circle Award for Best Actor. In 2019, Phoenix starred as Arthur Fleck/Joker, a failed stand-up comedian in the psychological thriller Joker. His performance went on to win the Academy Award for Best Actor, BAFTA Award for Best Actor in a Leading Role, and the Golden Globe Award for Best Actor – Motion Picture Drama.

Awards and nominations

References

External links 
 

Awards
Phoenix, Joaquin